Konská may refer to:
 Konská, Czech Republic, village in Frýdek-Místek District, Czech Republic
 Konská, Liptovský Mikuláš District, village in Liptovský Mikuláš District, Slovakia
 Konská, Žilina District, village in Žilina District, Slovakia